Stein may refer to:

Places

Austria
 Stein, a neighbourhood of Krems an der Donau, Lower Austria
 Stein, Styria, a municipality in the district of Fürstenfeld, Styria
 Stein (Lassing), a village in the district of Liezen, Styria
 Stein an der Enns, a village in the district of Liezen, Styria

Canada
 Stein River, a tributary of the Fraser River, from the Nlaka'pamux language Stagyn, meaning "hidden place"
Stein Valley Nlaka'pamux Heritage Park, a British Columbia provincial park comprising the basin of that river
Stein Mountain, a mountain in the Lillooet Ranges named for the river
Stein Lake, a lake in the upper reaches of the Stein River basin

Germany
 Stein, Bavaria, a town in the district of Fürth, Bavaria
 Stein, Schleswig-Holstein, a municipality in the district of Plön, Schleswig-Holstein
 Stein (Kochel am See), a mountain in Bavaria
 Stein an der Traun, a village in Upper Bavaria, part of the town of Traunreut
 Stein-Bockenheim, a municipality in the district Alzey-Worms, Rhineland-Palatinate
 Stein-Neukirch, a municipality in the district Westerwaldkreis, Rhineland-Palatinate
 Stein-Wingert, a municipality in the district Westerwaldkreis, Rhineland-Palatinate

Netherlands
 Stein, Limburg, a municipality and town
 Stein, South Holland, a small village in the municipality of Krimpenerwaard

Switzerland
 Stein, Aargau
 Stein, Appenzell in the canton of Appenzell Ausserrhoden
 Stein, Meiringen, in the canton of Bern
 Stein, St. Gallen
 Stein am Rhein
 Stein (Obersaxen), a mountain above Obersaxen
 Stein Glacier, in the canton of Bern

Elsewhere
 Steins, New Mexico, a ghost town in New Mexico, near the Arizona border, United States
 Stein, Skye, a village on the isle of Skye, Scotland, United Kingdom
 Stein Islands, Antarctica
 Stein am Anger (Steinamanger), the German name of Szombathely, Hungary
 Stein, the German name of Dacia village, Jibert Commune, Braşov County, Romania
 Stein in Oberkrain, the German name of Kamnik, Slovenia

Outer space
 Stein (lunar crater)
 Stein (crater on Venus), a crater on Venus

People 
 Stein (surname), a surname, including a list of people with the name
 Stein Huysegems (born 1982), Belgian association football player
 Stein Mehren (1935–2017), Norwegian poet, author, essayist and playwright
 Stein Metzger (born 1972), American beach volleyball player
 Stein Reinertsen (born 1960), Norwegian  clergyman and bishop
 Stein Rokkan (1921–1979), Norwegian political scientist and sociologist
 Stein Stone (1882–1926), American football and basketball player and coach
 Stein Eriksen (1927-2015), Swedish Olympic skier and ski personality

Other uses
 Beer stein
 Stein (brewery), a beer brewery in Bratislava, Slovakia
 USS Stein (FF-1065), a frigate in the U.S. Navy
 Stein (grape), another name for the white wine grape Chenin blanc
 Steinwein, wine from the Franconia vineyard Würzburger Stein
 Stein (band), theatre music group made up of Katharina Franck, FM Einheit and Ulrike Haage

See also 
 Stein Castle (disambiguation)
 Stein mansion
 Steiner (disambiguation)
 Steins (disambiguation)
 Stine
 Stein House (disambiguation)
 Justice Stein (disambiguation)